Scharnhorst may refer to:

People
Gerhard von Scharnhorst (1755–1813), Prussian general

Ships
, a passenger steamer built in 1904
SMS Scharnhorst (1907), an armored cruiser of World War I, sunk at the Battle of the Falkland Islands
, a German ocean liner, eventually purchased by Japan and converted into the escort carrier Shinyo
, a German capital ship which saw action in World War II and was sunk at the Battle of the North Cape
Scharnhorst, formerly , a ship of the West German Bundesmarine from 1959 until 1980

Other
Scharnhorst Order, the highest medal awarded to the East German National People's Army
Scharnhorst, Lower Saxony, a municipality in the district of Celle, Lower Saxony, Germany
Scharnhorst effect, a hypothetical phenomenon in which light travels faster between two closely spaced conducting plates than in a normal vacuum